Events from the year 1868 in the United States.

Incumbents

Federal Government 
 President: Andrew Johnson (D-Tennessee)
 Vice President: vacant
 Chief Justice: Salmon P. Chase (Ohio)
 Speaker of the House of Representatives: Schuyler Colfax (R-Indiana)
 Congress: 40th

Events

January–March
 January 6 – Asa Mercer and a number of new "Mercer Girls" sail from Massachusetts for the West Coast, arriving in Seattle on May 23.
 January 9 – John William De Forest, writing for The Nation, calls for a more specifically American literature; the essay's title, "The Great American Novel", is the first known use of the term.
 February – The Benjamin Franklin "Z Grill" postage stamp is issued; it will be among the rarest ever.
 February 16 – In New York City the Jolly Corks organization is renamed the Benevolent and Protective Order of Elks (BPOE).
 February 24
 Impeachment of Andrew Johnson: Three days after his action to dismiss Secretary of War Edwin M. Stanton, the House of Representatives votes 126 to 47 in favor of a resolution to impeach Andrew Johnson, the first of three Presidents to be impeached by the full House. Johnson is later acquitted by the Senate in his impeachment trial.
 The first parade to have floats occurs at Mardi Gras in New Orleans, Louisiana.
 March 1 – The Pi Kappa Alpha fraternity is founded at the University of Virginia.
 March 5 – A court of impeachment is organized in the United States Senate to hear charges against President Andrew Johnson in an impeachment trial.
 March 23 – The University of California is founded in Oakland, California, when the Organic Act is signed into California law.
 March 27 – The Lake Ontario Shore Railroad Company is organized in Oswego, New York.

April–June
 April 1 – The Hampton Normal and Agricultural Institute is established in Hampton, Virginia.
 April 29 – After pursuing a policy of total war on the Plain Indians, General William Tecumseh Sherman brokers the Treaty of Fort Laramie (1868).
 May 9 – The city of Reno, Nevada is founded.
 May 16 and 26 – President Andrew Johnson is acquitted during his impeachment trial by one vote in the United States Senate.
 May 30 – Memorial Day is observed in the United States for the first time (it was  proclaimed on May 5 by General John A. Logan).
 June 3 – Crown Point, Indiana is incorporated a town.
 June 25 – Florida, Alabama, Louisiana, North Carolina, and South Carolina are all readmitted to the U.S.
 June 27 – Lowell, Indiana is incorporated a town.

July–September
 July 25 – Wyoming Territory is organized.
 July 28 – The 14th Amendment to the United States Constitution is adopted,  guaranteeing African Americans full citizenship and all persons in the United States due process of law.
 September – The first volume of Louisa May Alcott's novel Little Women is published.
 September 18 – The University of the South holds its first convocation in Sewanee, Tennessee.
 September 23 – Rebels (some 400–600) in the town of Lares declare Puerto Rico independent; the local militia easily defeats them a week later.

October–December
 October 6 – The City of New York grants Mount Sinai Hospital a 99-year lease for a property on Lexington Avenue and 66th Street, for the sum of $1.00.
 October 7 – Cornell University in Ithaca, New York, is opened, with an initial enrollment of 412 men the following day.
 October 21 – The M6.3–6.7 Hayward earthquake affects the San Francisco Bay Area with a maximum Mercalli intensity of IX (Violent), causing damage from Santa Rosa to Santa Cruz.
 October 28 – Thomas Edison applies for his first patent, the electric vote recorder.
 November 3 – U.S. presidential election, 1868: Ulysses S. Grant defeats Horatio Seymour in the election.
 November 25 – The Alpha Tau Omega fraternity is founded at the University of Virginia.
 November 27 – Indian Wars – Battle of Washita River: In the early morning, United States Army Lieutenant Colonel George Armstrong Custer leads an attack on a band of Cheyenne living on reservation land with Chief Black Kettle, killing 103 Cheyenne.
 December 25 – President Andrew Johnson grants unconditional pardon to all Civil War rebels.

Undated
 Maryland School for the Deaf is established.
 The Roman Catholic See of Tucson is established as the Apostolic Vicariate of Arizona in 1868, taking its territory from the former Diocese of Santa Fe. The Diocese of Tucson is canonically erected on May 8, 1897.

Ongoing
 Reconstruction era (1865–1877)

Births
 Early ? (or November 24?) – Scott Joplin, African American ragtime composer and pianist (died 1917)
 January 31 – Theodore William Richards, chemist, recipient of Nobel Prize in Chemistry in 1914 (died 1928)
 February 3 – William J. Harris, U.S. Senator from Georgia from 1919 to 1932 (died 1932)
 February 5 – Maxine Elliott, actress and businesswoman (died 1940 in France)
 February 10 – William Allen White, journalist (died 1944)
 February 16 – John Rogan, second tallest person in recorded history (died 1905)
 February 20 – John Nathan Cobb, author, naturalist, conservationist, fisheries researcher and educator (died 1930)
 February 23 – W. E. B. Du Bois, African American civil rights leader (died 1963)
 April 6 – Helen Hyde, etcher and engraver (died 1919)
 April 8 – Herbert Spencer Jennings, zoologist (died 1947)
 April 12 
 Annie Stevens Perkins, author (unknown year of death)
 Ella Gaunt Smith, doll-maker (died 1932)
 April 21 – Alfred Henry Maurer, modernist painter (suicide 1932)
 April 28 – Hélène de Pourtalès, born Helen Barbey, Olympic sailor (died 1945 in Switzerland)
 March 22 – Robert Millikan, physicist, recipient of Nobel Prize in Physics in 1923 (died 1953)
 May 2 – Robert W. Wood, optical physicist (died 1955)
 May 10 – Ed Barrow, baseball player and manager (died 1953)
 June 4 – Thomas F. Bayard, Jr., U.S. Senator from Delaware from 1922 to 1929 (died 1942)
 June 8 – Robert Robinson Taylor, first accredited African American architect (died 1942)
 June 28 – John F. Nugent, U.S. Senator from Idaho from 1918 to 1921 (died 1931)
 July 4 – Henrietta Swan Leavitt, astronomer (died 1921)
 August 21 – Vess Ossman, ragtime banjo player (died 1923)
 August 23 – Edgar Lee Masters, poet, biographer, dramatist and lawyer (died 1950)
 September 8 – Seth Weeks, African American jazz mandolin player, composer, arranger and bandleader (died 1953)
 September 9 – Mary Hunter Austin, writer (died 1934)
 September 11 – Henry Justin Allen, U.S. Senator from Kansas from 1929 to 1931 (died 1950)
 September 22 – John T. Raulston, state judge (died 1956)
 October 8 – Coleman Livingston Blease, U.S. Senator from South Carolina from 1925 to 1931 (died 1942)
 October 10 – Anne Hazen McFarland, physician and medical journal editor (unknown year of death)
 November 3 – Harry Grant Dart, cartoonist (died 1938)
 November 22 – John Nance Garner, 32nd Vice President of the United States from 1933 to 1941 (died 1967)
 November 23 – Mary Brewster Hazelton, portrait painter (died 1953)
 December 14 – Louise Hammond Willis Snead, artist, writer, and composer (died 1958)
 December 17 – Frederic M. Sackett, U.S. Senator from Kentucky from 1925 to 1930 (died 1941)
 December 19 – Eleanor H. Porter, novelist (died 1920)
 December 25 – Eugenie Besserer, silent film actress (died 1934)
date unknown – Luther Standing Bear, Native American film actor (died 1939)

Deaths
 March 4
 Richard H. Bayard, U.S. Senator from Delaware from 1841 to 1845 (born 1796)
 Jesse Chisholm, pioneer (born c. 1805)
 May 10 – Henry Bennett, politician (born 1808)
 May 23 –  Kit Carson, trapper, scout and Indian agent (born 1809)
 May 24 – Emanuel Leutze, history painter (born 1816 in Germany)
 May 31 – John J. McRae, U.S. Senator from Mississippi from 1851 to 1852 (born 1815)
 June 1 – James Buchanan, 15th President of the United States from 1857 to 1861 (born 1791)
 June 6 – Daniel Pierce Thompson, novelist and lawyer (born 1795)
 June 15 – Warren Ives Bradley, children's author (born 1847)
 June 22 – Heber C. Kimball, Latter Day Saint leader (born 1801)
 July 15 – William T. G. Morton, pioneer of anaesthesia (born 1819)
 July 7 – Edward Coles, planter, politician and the second governor of Illinois (born 1786)
 August 11 – Thaddeus Stevens, politician (born 1792)
 September 17 – Hook Nose, Northern Cheyenne warrior (born c.1823)
 September 19 – William Sprague, minister and politician from Michigan (born 1809)
 October 9 – Howell Cobb, politician (born 1815)
 November 27 – Black Kettle, Southern Cheyenne Peace Chief (born 1803)
 December 25 – Linus Yale, Jr., inventor (born 1821)

See also
Timeline of United States history (1860–1899)

References

External links
 

 
1860s in the United States
United States
United States
Years of the 19th century in the United States